Lithopoma is a genus of medium-sized to large sea snails with a calcareous operculum, marine gastropod mollusks in the subfamily Turbininae  of the  family Turbinidae, the turban snails.

Description
The elevated, imperforate shell has a turbinate or trochiform shape. with a plicate spire that is flat or concave below. Its periphery is carinated or rounded. The base of the shell is somewhat convex. The whorls above are radiately plicate. The operculum is oval, outside coarsely granulose, and either simply convex or with a curved spiral rib with its terminations connected by a straight one. The nucleus is submarginal.

Distribution
This genus occurs in the Caribbean Sea, the Gulf of Mexico and off the Lesser Antilles.

Species
Species within this genus were previously placed in the genus Astraea. They include:
 Lithopoma americanum (Gmelin, 1791)
 Lithopoma brevispina (Lamarck, 1822)
 Lithopoma caelatum (Gmelin, 1791)
 Lithopoma phoebium (Röding, 1798)
 Lithopoma tectum (Lightfoot, 1786)
 Lithopoma tuber (Linnaeus, 1758)
Species brought into synonymy
 Lithopoma gibberosa (Dillwyn, 1817) : synonym of Pomaulax gibberosus (Dillwyn, 1817)
 Lithopoma gibberosum (Dillwyn, 1817): synonym of  Pomaulax gibberosus (Dillwyn, 1817)
 Lithopoma heliotropium (Martyn, T., 1784): synonym of Astraea heliotropium (Martyn, 1784)
 Lithopoma imbricatum Gmelin, J.F., 1791: synonym of  Lithopoma tectum (Lightfoot, 1786)
 Lithopoma phoebium longispina Lamarck, J.B.P.A. de, 1822: synonym of  Lithopoma phoebium (Röding, 1798)
 Lithopoma tectum americanum (Gmelin, 1791): synonym of Lithopoma americanum (Gmelin, 1791)
 Lithopoma tuber venezuelensis Flores, C. & Cáceres de Talarico, 1980: synonym of  Lithopoma tuber (Linnaeus, 1758)
 Lithopoma undosum (W. Wood, 1828): synonym of  Megastraea undosa (W. Wood, 1828)

References

 Williams, S.T. (2007). Origins and diversification of Indo-West Pacific marine fauna: evolutionary history and biogeography of turban shells (Gastropoda, Turbinidae). Biological Journal of the Linnean Society, 2007, 92, 573–592
 Alf A. & Kreipl K. (2011) The family Turbinidae. Subfamilies Turbininae Rafinesque, 1815 and Prisogasterinae Hickman & McLean, 1990. In: G.T. Poppe & K. Groh (eds), A Conchological Iconography. Hackenheim: Conchbooks. pp. 1–82, pls 104-245

External links

 Malacolog info at: 

 
Turbinidae
Gastropod genera
Taxa named by John Edward Gray